This is a list of countries that gives the percent of households with guns. It is further broken down by the percent of households with handguns. Also, by the percent of adults living in armed households. The data is from GunPolicy.org which is hosted by the Sydney Medical School, at the University of Sydney in Australia. GunPolicy.org consolidates this data from various sources. To avoid problems with vetting the data for hundreds of countries from hundreds of sources, the table below only uses data compiled by GunPolicy.org.

See also: Estimated number of civilian guns per capita by country. It provides estimates of the total number of civilian guns in a country. It then calculates the number per 100 persons. This number for a country does not indicate the percentage of the population that possesses guns. This is because individuals can possess more than one gun.



Table 

Note: This is a work in progress. Feel free to add GunPolicy.org data for more countries. See the top of the talk page for more editing notes.

Sources column links to the specific country pages at GunPolicy.org

See also
 Gun politics
 Small arms trade
 Small Arms and Light Weapons
 List of countries by firearm-related death rate
 Index of gun politics articles
 List of countries by intentional homicide rate
 Overview of gun laws by nation
 Long gun
 Handgun
 :Category: Firearms

References

Guns